Ernst Grawitz may refer to:

 Ernst-Robert Grawitz (1899–1945), German physician 
 Ernst Grawitz (hematologist) (1860–1911), German hematologist